Chlorococcopsis is a genus of green algae, specifically of the Chlorococcaceae. , AlgaeBase accepted only one species, Chlorococcopsis wimmeri, of "uncertain taxonomic status".

References

External links

Scientific references

Scientific databases
 AlgaTerra database
 Index Nominum Genericorum

Chlorococcaceae
Chlorococcaceae genera